Lake Junaluska is a census-designated place (CDP) in Haywood County, North Carolina, United States, and a manmade lake in the Blue Ridge Mountains. It is part of the Asheville Metropolitan Statistical Area.

Lake Junaluska is named after nearby Mount Junaluska (now North Eaglenest Mountain), which was named after Chief Junaluska, a Cherokee leader in the early nineteenth century. As of the 2010 census, the population of the community was 2,734.

The  manmade lake of the same name is surrounded by private residences and the Lake Junaluska Conference and Retreat Center. The lake is fed primarily from Richland Creek and discharges into the creek, maintaining an approximately constant lake level. Richland Creek is a tributary to the Pigeon River. Recreation on the lake includes canoes, kayaks, fishing and swimming. To maintain a quiet environment, only electric trolling motors are permitted to operate on the lake. There is a  paved walking trail around the lake. The Blue Ridge Parkway is nearby, as is Great Smoky Mountains National Park.

Lake Junaluska was formerly the site of the headquarters of the World Methodist Council.

History
Before Indian Removal in 1839, all this area was part of the homelands of the Cherokee people. Today the Eastern Band of Cherokee Indians is based on Qualla Boundary in North Carolina, the only federally recognized tribe in the state. European Americans colonized most of the former Cherokee territories.

Methodist pastors James Atkins and George R. Stuart believed the Southeastern United States needed a place comparable to Chautauqua Lake, New York and Winona Lake, Indiana. Atkins contacted Stuart in April 1908 while attending a missionary conference in Chattanooga, Tennessee where Stuart was a pastor. The Southern Assembly, Inc. bought 1200 acres of land.

On June 25, 1913, the Second General Missionary Conference of the Methodist Episcopal Church, South convened in the new auditorium built here and named for Stuart. It was beside a new lake being filled after the damming of Richland Creek. As there were only 13 houses and no hotel until 1914, the 4,000 people had to stay elsewhere.

Auditorium Hotel, the first hotel, was built in 1914 across from Stuart Auditorium but burned in 1920.

The Junaluska Inn was built in 1917, but it caught fire and burned down the next year. A new hotel in 1921 was built on the same site, eventually to be named for Bishop Walter Russell Lambuth. Additions were made in 1956 and 1964.

In 1923, a classroom building called Shackford Hall was constructed at the lake's west end. Both Lambuth Inn and Shackford Hall have been listed on the National Register of Historic Places.

In 1922, a large, lighted cross was erected at a spot overlooking the lake near Lambuth Inn, the oldest hotel at the lake. In 1994, a new cross was installed. The original, eventually restored, was moved to Mount Shepherd Retreat Center near Asheboro, North Carolina.

The Southeastern Jurisdiction (SEJ) of the United Methodist Church became the owner in 1948. Lake Junaluska Assembly Inc., an agency of the SEJ, has been tax-exempt since 1959. In the 1950s, the World Methodist Council, a consultative body linking almost all Methodist denominations worldwide, moved its headquarters to Lake Junaluska. In Spring 2021, the World Methodist Council sold its headquarters building, including a museum, to the assembly for $1.25 million. The World Methodist Council moved to offices in nearby Waynesville. The museum's collection moved to Southern Methodist University.

Conference and Retreat Center

Lake Junaluska Assembly Inc. received financial support from the United Methodist Church for nearly 100 years, but that support ended and the Assembly became more of a business. The Lake Junaluska Assembly Board of Directors, in addition to acting as the "de facto government", owns the Lake Junaluska Conference and Retreat Center, the lake and the dam, and recreational facilities. The board voted in March 2013 to ask for Waynesville to annex the community.

The Lake Junaluska Conference and Retreat Center hosts events for the United Methodist Church, Seventh-day Adventist Church, The Salvation Army, Church of the Brethren, and other organizations. Several musical events are hosted in Stuart Auditorium, including Folkmoot USA programs and Appalachian bluegrass concerts. The Smoky Mountain Folk Festival is held here. The facilities are intended to be used for the renewal of "body, mind and spirit".

The Terrace  Hotel and the Lambuth Inn, the community's primary accommodations, were extensively renovated in 2015 and 2018. The Corneille Bryan Native Garden contains  many plants once abundant in the region but now rare.

The Conference and Retreat Center is governed by an active, diverse 32-member Board of Trustees. Some 68% of the Board members are property owners in the Lake Junaluska community. The board provides strategic direction, and budget approval for the Conference and Retreat Center, the Lake Junaluska Public Works, residential fees, and utility (water and sewer) rates. The Executive Director, who has day-to-day management responsibility, reports to the board of Trustees. The board approves changes to the rules and regulations of the community.

The amenities of Lake Junaluska include lodging, meeting facilities, dining (food service), trails, gardens, meditation areas, golf, and other recreation opportunities. The maintenance of the public areas around the lake and the dam, which is inspected annually, are funded primarily through charitable giving and proceeds from lodging guests. There is periodic removal of sediment that has been carried into the lake from Richland Creek.

Work began in 2022 on a $2.5 million renovation of the former World Methodist Council headquarters, which Lake Junaluska purchased for $1.25 million along with an adjacent building in 2021. The former headquarters was named the Warren Center for Mike and Anne Warren, who gave $625,000 toward the purchase and $1.1 million for the renovation. The building will be used for smaller events.

Geography

The community of Lake Junaluska is located in central Haywood County just east of the artificial lake of the same name. The lake was formed by damming Richland Creek (a tributary to the Pigeon River) which flows northwest of the community. The closest high summits are  High Top on Utah Mountain,  to the north; and  North Eaglenest Mountain (formerly Mount Junaluska),  to the southwest.

The community is bordered by Waynesville, the Haywood county seat, to the south; Maggie Valley to the west, and Clyde to the east. U.S. Routes 19, 23, 74, and 276 all pass through the community. Interstate 40 passes just northeast of the community, with access from Exits 24 and 27.

Route 19 leads west  to Cherokee, base on the Eastern Band of Cherokee Indians and near the south entrance to Great Smoky Mountains National Park.

Climate
Lake Junaluska has an oceanic climate under the Köppen climate classification (Köppen Cfb). Precipitation averages  annually, and snowfall averages .

Today

The Lake Junaluska Public Works office manages the roads and utilities. Water for the community is purchased from the town of Waynesville, and sewage treatment is provided by Waynesville through a purchase agreement. Water and sewer fees and annual service fees provide funds for maintenance and improvements to the infrastructure. The community has engaged in a program to renew roads and systematically replace water and sewer lines without incurring debt. A prioritized list of improvements was initially developed, and replacement of the oldest underground water lines has saved money by reducing water loss due to leakage.
					
A Community Council of elected representatives provides guidance to the public works office and Conference and Retreat Center leadership on issues that impact the community, such as utility rates, annual service charges, residential rules, and regulations. Open monthly meetings also provide a means for the property owners to learn about new developments in the community and provide input to the council and the conference and retreat center leadership.
					
The community of residents, year-round and seasonal alike, are a very diverse active group that enjoy many opportunities for involvement in recreation and fellowship. Community organizations include the Lake Junaluska Assembly Property Owners organization (LJAPOO), which addresses issues associated with the ownership, and the Junaluskans, which is a service group that meets twice monthly and supports many activities.
					
The campus is also the home to the Foundation for Evangelism, a non-profit organization serving ministries of the United Methodist Church by promoting the growth of new generations of clergy and laity that have a passion for evangelism.

Demographics

2020 census

As of the 2020 United States census, there were 3,219 people, 1,477 households, and 841 families residing in the CDP.

2000 census
As of the census of 2000, there were 2,675 people, 1,262 households, and 861 families residing in the CDP. The population density was 483.6 people per square mile (186.8/km2). There were 1,848 housing units at an average density of 334.1 per square mile (129.0/km2). The racial makeup of the CDP was 98.65% White, 0.37% African American, 0.26% Native American, 0.11% Asian, 0.07% from other races, and 0.52% from two or more races. Hispanic or Latino of any race were 1.35% of the population.

There were 1,262 households, out of which 18.1% had children under the age of 18 living with them, 58.3% were married couples living together, 7.8% had a female householder with no husband present, and 31.7% were non-families. 29.5% of all households were made up of individuals, and 14.3% had someone living alone who was 65 years of age or older. The average household size was 2.12 and the average family size was 2.57.

In the CDP, the population was spread out, with 16.2% under the age of 18, 5.7% from 18 to 24, 20.6% from 25 to 44, 29.4% from 45 to 64, and 28.1% who were 65 years of age or older. The median age was 50 years. For every 100 females, there were 86.7 males. For every 100 females age 18 and over, there were 82.1 males.

The median income for a household in the CDP was $46,932, and the median income for a family was $54,444. Males had a median income of $38,224 versus $29,219 for females. The per capita income for the CDP was $23,031. About 4.2% of families and 8.7% of the population were below the poverty line, including 17.9% of those under age 18 and 3.0% of those age 65 or over.

References

Further reading

External links

 Lake Junaluska Conference and Retreat Center

 
Census-designated places in Haywood County, North Carolina